James Harcourt (20 April 187318 February 1951) was an English character actor.

Harcourt was born in Headingley, Leeds, West Riding of Yorkshire. He started work as a cabinet maker, and drifted into amateur dramatics. He appeared as a stage actor first in 1903 and worked with the Liverpool Repertory Company from 1919 to 1931, and was with the Old Vic in the mid 1940s.

In 1947, Harcourt appeared in the original West End production of the popular musical Bless the Bride, directed by Wendy Toye.

He was married to the actress Isadora Keith, and was the father of camera operator and cinematographer David Harcourt.

He died in Eton, Buckinghamshire on 18 February 1951 aged 77.

Filmography

References

 "Halliwell's Who's Who in the Movies" - published by Harper-Collins 1981 -

External links
 

1873 births
1951 deaths
English male stage actors
English male film actors
People from Headingley
20th-century English male actors